Lancaster House (originally known as York House and then Stafford House) is a mansion in the St James's district in the West End of London. It is close to St James's Palace, and much of the site was once part of the palace complex. This Grade I listed building is now managed by the Foreign and Commonwealth Office.

History
Construction of the house commenced in 1825 for the Duke of York and Albany, the second son of King George III, and it was initially known as York House. Sir Robert Smirke was originally hired to design the house, until under the influence of the Duke's mistress the Duchess of Rutland, he was replaced by Benjamin Dean Wyatt who mainly designed the exterior. The house was only a shell by the time of the death of the Duke in 1827. It is constructed from Bath stone, in a neo-classical style, being the last great London mansion to use this essentially Georgian style.

The lease of the house was purchased by and completed for the 2nd Marquess of Stafford (later 1st Duke of Sutherland) and was known as Stafford House for almost a century. It was assessed for rating purposes (i.e. for property taxes) as the most valuable private house in London.

The completed building was three floors in height, the State rooms being on the first floor or piano nobile, family living rooms on the ground floor and family bedrooms on the second floor. There is also a basement containing service rooms, including the government wine cellar. The interior was designed by Benjamin Dean Wyatt, Sir Charles Barry and Sir Robert Smirke and was completed in 1840.

The Sutherlands’ liberal politics and love of the arts attracted many distinguished guests, including factory reformer the Earl of Shaftesbury, anti-slavery author Harriet Beecher Stowe and Italian revolutionary leader Giuseppe Garibaldi. Chopin gave a recital there in 1848 in the presence of Queen Victoria. Almost as influential as the visitors was the décor, which was to set the fashion for London reception rooms for nearly a century. The mainly Louis XIV Style interiors created a stunning backdrop for the Sutherlands’ impressive collection of paintings and objets d’art, much of which can still be seen in the house today.

Queen Victoria is said to have remarked to the 2nd Duchess of Sutherland on arriving at Stafford House, "I have come from my House to your Palace." With its ornate decoration and the dramatic sweep of the great staircase, the Grand Hall is a magnificent introduction to one of the finest town houses in London. The house went out of royal favour after the 3rd Duchess died, in 1888,  and her husband married his mistress within months.

In 1912 the lease was purchased by the Lancastrian soap-maker Sir William Lever, 1st Baronet (later 1st Viscount Leverhulme) who renamed it in honour of his native county of Lancashire and presented it to the nation in the following year.

Since 1922 the building has housed the Government Wine Cellar.

From 1924 until shortly after the Second World War, the house was the home of the London Museum, but it is now used for government receptions and is closed to the public except on rare open days.

The European Advisory Commission met at the house in 1944. In January 1947 a special envoy meeting on affairs concerning occupied Austria was hosted here. The year 1956 saw the signing of the agreement of independence for Malaya. In 1961, South Africa affirmed its intention to become a republic, inside the Commonwealth. In 1979 it was the scene of the Lancaster House Agreement, which was the agreement of independence from the United Kingdom and Rhodesia, now Zimbabwe.

The house was the venue for the 10th G7 summit in 1984 and the 17th G7 summit in 1991.  A new 35-foot-long table was built for the Long Gallery, where the main negotiating sessions were planned in 1991.

Prime Minister Theresa May gave a speech at Lancaster House in January 2017 outlining Britain's intended future relationship with the European Union following the 2016 United Kingdom European Union membership referendum which resulted in a vote to leave. The speech is commonly referred to in the media, and in political discourse, as the "Lancaster House speech".

In popular culture
Lancaster House has been extensively used as a filming location. It has stood in for Buckingham Palace at least six times in film and television: for the comedy film King Ralph (1991), the mystery adventure film National Treasure: Book of Secrets (2007), the historical drama film The Young Victoria (2009), the historical drama film The King's Speech (2010), and the 2013 Christmas special for Downton Abbey, when Rose is presented to the King and Queen during the London Season. Lancaster House reprised its role as Buckingham Palace for the Netflix series The Crown.

Winston Churchill commented that towards the end of the 19th century, "glittering parties at Lansdowne House, Devonshire House or Stafford House (Lancaster House) comprised all the elements which made a gay and splendid social circle in close relation to the business of Parliament, the hierarchies of the Army and Navy, and the policy of the State".

The interior was used to represent the Winter Palace in St. Petersburg for the 1981 film Reds. It also appears as the house of Lady Bracknell in the comedy of manners film The Importance of Being Earnest (2002), and as the site of a masquerade ball in the Merchant-Ivory film The Golden Bowl (2000).

See also
The Lancaster House Conferences
The Lancaster House Treaties
The Lancaster House Agreement
The Government Wine Cellar

References

Bibliography

External links

Houses in the City of Westminster
St James's
Houses completed in 1840
National government buildings in London
Grade I listed buildings in the City of Westminster
Grade I listed government buildings
Grade I listed houses in London
!
Georgian architecture in the City of Westminster
Neoclassical architecture in London
Charles Barry buildings